Mario Alberto Ishii (born 22 June 1951) is an Argentine politician of the Justicialist Party, currently serving as intendente (mayor) of José C. Paz, a partido in the Greater Buenos Aires metropolitan area. He is popularly known as El Japonés ("the Japanese") due to his Japanese heritage.

He was first elected mayor in 1999, and continued to be so until 2013, when he was elected to the as Buenos Aires Province Senate. In 2015, he was once again elected mayor.

In August 2020 a video was leaked, showing him accusing city workers of selling drugs in municipal ambulances and saying he had to cover for them, causing major national media attention and a legal case to be opened. He then claimed that when he said "drugs" he had meant "medicines".

References

External links

1951 births
Living people
Argentine politicians of Japanese descent
Mayors of José C. Paz, Buenos Aires
Members of the Buenos Aires Province Senate
People from José C. Paz Partido
21st-century Argentine politicians